This a list of notable graduates of Siena College in Loudonville, New York.

Notable alumni

Academics
Steven Lamy, professor of international relations and Vice Dean for the College of Letters, Arts, and Sciences at the University of Southern California

Arts and literature
William J. Kennedy, 1984 Pulitzer Prize for Fiction winner
Len Roberts, award-winning poet
Ron Vawter, actor and a founding member of The Wooster Group

Government
Francis Bergan, former Presiding Justice of the New York Court of Appeals
Michael Botticelli, former director of the Office of National Drug Control Policy
Charles R. Boutin, member of the Maryland House of Delegates 
Anthony Brindisi, class of 2000, United States Representative from New York, 22nd Congressional District of New York from 2019 to 2021
Constantine George Cholakis, former Judge of the United States District Court for the Northern District of New York
Michael Dempsey, Acting Director of National Intelligence, Deputy DNI for Intelligence Integration
Mae D'Agostino, United States District Judge for the United States District Court for the Northern District of New York
George Deukmejian, 35th Governor of California
Michael C. Finnegan, former Counsel to the Governor of New York during the George Pataki Administration
Chris Gibson, former United States Representative
Wayne LaPierre, gun rights advocate; Executive Vice President and CEO of the National Rifle Association
John McEneny, member of the New York State Assembly
Jack Quinn, former United States Representative from New York; President of Erie Community College 
Gerald B. H. Solomon, former United States Representative from New York
Henry F. Zwack, Justice of the New York Supreme Court, 3rd Judicial District

Journalism
Jack Cashill, author and journalist
Erich Hartmann, international award-winning photojournalist; former President of Magnum Photos
David Hepp, award-winning journalist and creator of Inside Albany

Religion
Harry Flynn, Archbishop Emeritus of Saint Paul and Minneapolis
Roberto González Nieves, Archbishop of San Juan

Sports
Matt Brady, men's basketball coach at James Madison University
Tim Christman, former Major League Baseball relief pitcher
Marcus Faison, professional basketball player
Matt Gage, Major League Baseball pitcher with the Toronto Blue Jays
Jeff Hafley, current head football coach at Boston College
Billy Harrell, former Major League Baseball infielder
Kenny Hasbrouck, professional basketball player
Gary Holle, former Major League Baseball first baseman
John Lannan, Major League Baseball pitcher
Michael E. Long, former men's basketball coach at The College of Saint Rose
Jack McClinton, professional basketball player
Charlie Taaffe, football coach at the University of Central Florida
Edwin Ubiles, professional basketball player

Fiction
 Olivia Benson, the main character in the long-running NBC police procedural Law and Order: Special Victims Unit, attended Siena College and was a member of a sorority there.

References

Siena College